Ghafurabad may refer to:
 Ghafurabad, Ardabil
 Ghafurabad, Sistan and Baluchestan